Peter Johan Støren (13 May 1859 – 5 December 1925) was a Norwegian operating manager and politician. 

Støren was born in Spydeberg to parish priest Abraham Wilhelm Støren and Lagertha Johanne Dircks . He was operating manager of the Telemark Canal from 1902. He was elected representative to the Stortinget from the Market towns of Telemark and Aust-Agder counties for the periods 1922–1924 and 1925–1927, for the Conservative Party.

References

1859 births
1925 deaths
People from Spydeberg
Conservative Party (Norway) politicians
Politicians from Telemark
Members of the Storting